Margreth Weivers (24 July 1926 – 3 February 2021) was a Swedish actress. She appeared in more than 100 films and television shows since 1943. 

Weivers died in February 2021, at the age of 94.

Selected filmography
 Private Bom (1948)
 A Swedish Love Story (1970)
 The Man from Majorca (1984)
 Det är långt till New York (1988)
 Lotta på Bråkmakargatan (1992)
 Spring of Joy (1993)
 Lotta flyttar hemifrån (1993)
 Glasblåsarns barn (1998)
 Jönssonligan spelar högt (2000)
 The Dog Hotel (2000)

References

External links

1926 births
2021 deaths
20th-century Swedish actresses
21st-century Swedish actresses
Swedish film actresses
Swedish television actresses
Actresses from Stockholm